Lieutenant General Wessel Kritzinger was a South African Army general, who served as Chief of Staff Operations for the Defence Force.

Military career
He was a qualified military parachutist and served as the OC Infantry School, OC Eastern Province Command, GOC Wits Command before being appointed to the DHQ  as the Chief of Staff Operations in 1992 - 1997. He retired at the end of July 1997.

Awards and decorations

References

South African Army generals
1944 births
Living people